Acavus phoenix, the giant land snail, is a species of air-breathing land snails, terrestrial pulmonate gastropod mollusks in the family Acavidae.

Taxonomy
There are two subspecies recognized:

Acavus phoenix phoenix
Acavus phoenix castaneus

Description
Acavus phoenix is the most common Acavus species on the island. Shell about 60mm in diameter and is rose colored and body black colored.

Distribution and habitat
This species is endemic to Sri Lanka. It is confined to wet zone of the country.

References

External links
Population Size, Plant Occupancy and Threats to Acavus

Acavidae
Gastropods described in 1854